Marial Makur Shayok (born July 26, 1995) is a Canadian professional basketball player for the Maine Celtics of the NBA G League. He played college basketball for the Virginia Cavaliers and Iowa State Cyclones.

Early life
Shayok was born in Ottawa, Ontario, to Sudanese father Makur and mother Helena. Makur had some basketball talent himself — the native of Sudan played at the University of Dayton. Marial has four siblings, including two who played college basketball in the NCAA. His sister, Yar, played for the University of Detroit Mercy, then signed with a professional team in France, while his older brother Shayok played at the IMG Academy and later at Bradley University.

Shayok started playing basketball at the age of seven, sometimes on the playgrounds, sometimes at the YMCA. Growing up, his favorite players were Michael Jordan, Kobe Bryant, Kevin Durant, Penny Hardaway, and Dwyane Wade.

High school career
Shayok attended Blair Academy, where he was coached by Joe Mantegna. He was a First Team All-Prep selection by The Star-Ledger. Coming out of high school, Shayok signed with Marquette but never played for the team.

College career
As a freshman at Virginia, Shayok averaged 3.8 points and 1.8 rebounds per game. The following season, he averaged 4.3 points and 1.9 rebounds per game. Shayok posted 8.9 points and 2.4 rebounds per game for the Cavaliers as a junior, shooting 44 percent from the field and 33 percent from 3-point range. He scored 23 points in Virginia’s victory in the first round of the NCAA Tournament against the UNC Wilmington Seahawks. Following the season, Shayok opted to transfer and signed with Iowa State on April 19, 2017.

Shayok scored 24 points in a 77-60 win over Kansas on January 5, 2019. On January 7, Shayok was named Big 12 Player of the Week. In the semifinals of the Big 12 Conference tournament, the redshirt senior hit a pair of big 3-pointers in the final two minutes to help five-seed Iowa State topped top seed Kansas State 63-59. Shayok finished with a game-high 21 points, helping the Cyclones battled back from a five-point deficit with 2 minutes, and 47 seconds remaining. None were bigger than the final two Shayok hit. On March 16, 2019, in the finals of the Big 12 Conference tournament, Shayok scored 15 points in a 78-66 win over Kansas and was named the Big 12 tournament MVP to add to being named First-team All-Big 12.

On day two of the Portsmouth Invitational Tournament,  Shayok scored 37 points, including a three-pointer to force overtime for his team, as well as the game-winning shot in OT. He was 7-of-9 from three-point range and also had 7 rebounds. He was later named as part of the PIT All-Tournament Team.

Professional career

Philadelphia 76ers (2019–2020)
Shayok was selected with the 54th overall pick in the 2019 NBA draft by the Philadelphia 76ers. On July 7, 2019, the 76ers announced that they had signed Shayok to a two-way contract, meaning he would split time between the 76ers and their G League affiliate, the Delaware Blue Coats. Shayok was named G League player of the week on November 18 after averaging 35.0 points, 9.3 rebounds and 3.7 assists in three games for the Blue Coats, including 42 points against the Greensboro Swarm. On December 6, Shayok scored 31 points in a 110-109 win over the Capital City Go-Go on 13-of-23 shooting. He had 29 points and six assists on January 20, 2020, in a 119-109 win over the South Bay Lakers. On February 6, Shayok made his NBA debut for the 76ers, hitting a three-pointer in a 112-101 loss to the Milwaukee Bucks. During the shortened 2019-20 G League season, Shayok averaged 23 points, 6 rebounds, and 3.8 assists per game, shooting 46% from the field and 36% from three point range. The 76ers waived him during the offseason.

Frutti Extra Bursaspor (2021)
On January 5, 2021, he signed with Frutti Extra Bursaspor of the Turkish Super League (BSL). In 12 games with them, he averaged 18.9 points, 6.9 rebounds, and 4.2 assists.

Fenerbahçe (2021)
Following his very strong finish to the season, Shayok officially signed a two (1+1) year deal with fellow Turkish club Fenerbahçe on June 21, 2021.

Maine Celtics (2022–present)
On October 24, 2022, Shayok joined the Maine Celtics training camp roster.

Career statistics

NBA

Regular season

|-
| style="text-align:left;"| 
| style="text-align:left;"| Philadelphia
| 4 || 0 || 7.0 || .250 || .333 || .750 || 1.8 || .3 || .3 || .0 || 2.8
|- class="sortbottom"
| style="text-align:center;" colspan="2"| Career
| 4 || 0 || 7.0 || .250 || .333 || .750 || 1.8 || .3 || .3 || .0 || 2.8

College

|-
| style="text-align:left;"| 2014–15
| style="text-align:left;"| Virginia
| 34 || 1 || 14.6 || .405 || .380 || .630 || 1.8 || 1.0 || .6 || .3 || 3.8
|-
| style="text-align:left;"| 2015–16
| style="text-align:left;"| Virginia
| 35 || 8 || 15.0 || .492 || .436 || .548 || 1.9 || 1.1 || .3 || .1 || 4.3
|-
| style="text-align:left;"| 2016–17
| style="text-align:left;"| Virginia
| 34 || 14 || 20.6 || .445 || .328 || .796 || 2.4 || 1.0 || .9 || .3 || 8.9
|-
| style="text-align:left;"| 2018–19
| style="text-align:left;"| Iowa State
| 34 || 34 || 32.9 || .496 || .386 || .878 || 4.9 || 2.0 || .9 || .2 || 18.7
|- class="sortbottom"
| style="text-align:center;" colspan="2"| Career
| 137 || 57 || 20.7 || .470 || .381 || .787 || 2.7 || 1.3 || .7 || .2 || 8.9

References

External links
Iowa State Cyclones bio
NBA Draft Profile

1995 births
Living people
Basketball players from Ottawa
Black Canadian basketball players
Blair Academy alumni
Bursaspor Basketbol players
Canadian expatriate basketball people in Turkey
Canadian expatriate basketball people in the United States
Canadian men's basketball players
Canadian people of Sudanese descent
Delaware Blue Coats players
Fenerbahçe men's basketball players
Iowa State Cyclones men's basketball players
Maine Celtics players
National Basketball Association players from Canada
Philadelphia 76ers draft picks
Philadelphia 76ers players
Shooting guards
Virginia Cavaliers men's basketball players